Irene Marie Watler ( Strong; 3 March 1929 – 20 February 2018) was a Canadian competitive swimmer from Surrey, British Columbia. She competed at the 1948 Summer Olympics and the 1952 Summer Olympics.

References

External links
 

1929 births
2018 deaths
Canadian female swimmers
Olympic swimmers of Canada
Swimmers at the 1948 Summer Olympics
Swimmers at the 1952 Summer Olympics
Place of birth missing
20th-century Canadian women
21st-century Canadian women